Kozjak nad Pesnico is a dispersed settlement in the Municipality of Kungota in the western part of the Slovenian Hills in northeastern Slovenia.

Name
The name of the settlement was changed from Kozjak to Kozjak nad Pesnico in 1955.

Cultural heritage
There are two mansions in the settlement. Pahta Mansion ( or Pahtejev Grad) was built in 1870 in the hills south of Zgornja Kungota. Lepi Dol Mansion, built in the Pesnica Valley, is an early 18th-century Baroque mansion on the site of an earlier building. It was renovated in a Neoclassical style in the 19th century.

References

External links
Kozjak nad Pesnico on Geopedia

Populated places in the Municipality of Kungota